Coleman Bernard Bell, II (born April 22, 1970) is a former American football tight end in the National Football League for the Washington Redskins.  He played college football at the University of Miami. He won an NCAA national championship in 1991 with Miami, and was a teammate to future professional wrestler and actor Dwayne Johnson. 

1970 births
American football tight ends
Living people
Miami Hurricanes football players
Players of American football from Tampa, Florida
Thomas Jefferson High School (Tampa, Florida) alumni
Washington Redskins players